Grigorovo is a rural locality (a village) in Krasnoplamenskoye Rural Settlement, Alexandrovsky District, Vladimir Oblast, Russia. The population was 1 as of 2010.

Geography 
The village is located 17 km north-west from Krasnoye Plamya, 43 km north-west from Alexandrov.

References 

Rural localities in Alexandrovsky District, Vladimir Oblast